The 2001 season was the New York Giants' 77th in the National Football League and the fifth under head coach Jim Fassel. They were returning as Super Bowl runners-up from the 2000 season, after losing Super Bowl XXXV to the Baltimore Ravens. The Giants tried to improve on their 12–4 record from the previous year, instead they finished 7–9 and missed the playoffs for the first time since 1999. However, Michael Strahan was named Defensive Player of the Year for the 2001 season. He broke the NFL single season sack record with 22.5, surpassing Mark Gastineau's total of 22, by sacking Brett Favre of the Green Bay Packers at Giants Stadium in the final regular-season game. Following the season, defensive coordinator John Fox left to become the head coach of the Carolina Panthers, a team he would take to the Super Bowl just two years later.

Offseason

NFL Draft

Undrafted free agents

Staff

Roster

Season

Schedule

Game summaries

Week 1: at Denver Broncos  

at Invesco Field at Mile High, Denver, Colorado

 Date: September 10, 2001
 Game time: 7:00 p.m. MST (9:00 p.m. EST)
 TV: ABC
 Announcers: Al Michaels, Dan Fouts, Dennis Miller, Melissa Stark, and Eric Dickerson
 Referee: Bill Athan

The Giants began their NFC title defense on Monday Night Football in the first game at the Denver Broncos' new stadium, Invesco Field at Mile High (now known as Empower Field at Mile High).  
The Broncos opened the scoring with quarterback Brian Griese finding tight end Patrick Hape for a 1-yard touchdown to make the score 7–0.  The teams then went back and forth, with Kerry Collins hitting Amani Toomer for two touchdown passes (one from 43 yards and the other from 11 yards), while Griese threw another touchdown to Ed McCaffrey.  However, in the third quarter Griese threw his third touchdown of the day with a 25-yard strike to Rod Smith to give the Broncos a lead they would not relinquish.  A 9-yard touchdown in the fourth quarter by running back Mike Anderson clinched the game.

While Kerry Collins went 19 of 34 for 258 yards and 3 touchdowns with no interceptions, the Giants defense allowed 473 yards of total offense and failed to register a sack or force a turnover.

Week of Sunday, September 16:  No Games 

The Giants were initially scheduled to host the Packers in their home opener the following week, but due to the September 11th attacks, the games were cancelled and rescheduled for Week 17 of the season.  Numerous Giants, including Michael Strahan, were instrumental in having the games postponed out of respect for those whose lives had been impacted by the terrorist attacks.

Week 2: at Kansas City Chiefs  

The first game the Giants played after 9/11, and the first game either New York City team played after the attacks, was an interconference game at Kansas City.  Chiefs players joined Giants players before the game to honor those who had lost their lives and those who had been seriously impacted by the crisis.

When the two teams got back to football, what ensued was a sloppy and low-scoring game.  Running back Ron Dayne scored the game's only touchdown with a 7-yard run in the second quarter, and the Giants led 13–0 at the half. Kerry Collins reversed his performance from his last game with no touchdowns and 3 interceptions, but the Chiefs failed to turn any of his turnovers into points.  The Giants finally clinched the game with a 13-play drive that took up the remaining 7:21 of the clock.

Week 3: vs. New Orleans Saints  

at Giants Stadium, East Rutherford, New Jersey

 Date: September 30, 2001
 Game time: 1:00 p.m. EST
 TV: FOX
 Announcers: Dick Stockton, Troy Aikman, Daryl Johnston, and Pam Oliver
 Referee: Terry McAulay

The Giants' home opener of the 2001 season came against New Orleans.  It was the first NFL game held in the New York City metropolitan area after 9/11.

After a scoreless first quarter, the Giants opened the scoring in the second quarter with Ron Dayne running in for a 6-yard touchdown.  Tiki Barber added his first touchdown of the year on their next drive, a 14-yard run which made the score 14–3 at the half.  In the fourth quarter, Saints quarterback Aaron Brooks threw a 32-yard touchdown pass to wide receiver Willie Jackson to make the score 14–10, but the Giants answered with Kerry Collins finding Joe Jurevicius for a 46-yard touchdown to make it 21–10 with 6:05 to go.  Saints kicker John Carney kicked a 30-yard field goal to narrow the score to 21–13 with 4:36 remaining, then Collins lost a fumble to give the Saints the ball back at their own 30-yard line with 3:17 to go.  Brooks drove the Saints to the 9-yard line with 15 seconds left.  After spiking the ball, two incomplete passes brought up 4th and Goal from the 9-yard line on the final play of the game.  Brooks completed a pass to Jackson for what appeared to be a touchdown, but the officials ruled that Jackson had committed pass interference in order to make the catch, and the game ended.

The Giants won despite being outgained 330–253.  Ron Dayne ran for 111 yards on 19 carries with a touchdown while Michael Strahan registered his first three sacks of his record-breaking season.

\

Week 4: vs. Washington Redskins  

at Giants Stadium, East Rutherford, New Jersey

 Date: October 7, 2001
 Game time: 1:00 p.m. EST
 TV: FOX
 Announcers: Sam Rosen, Bill Maas, and Mike Crispino
 Referee: Johnny Grier

With the Giants hosting a Washington team that had been blasted by their first three opponents by a combined score of 112–16, this game had all the makings of an easy win.  However, the score was tied at 9–9 at the end of three quarters with Giants kicker Morten Andersen and Washington kicker Brett Conway trading three field goals apiece.  In the fourth quarter, the Giants finally took over.  With 12:59 to go, Kerry Collins found tight end Dan Campbell for a 1-yard touchdown pass to give the Giants the lead.  Then with 2:57 to go, Jason Sehorn intercepted a Tony Banks pass and returned it 34 yards for the game-clinching score.

The two teams combined for a whopping 9 turnovers, with the Giants committing 4 and Washington committing 5.  However, the Giants also held Washington to just 181 yards of total offense.

Amani Toomer led the offense with 7 receptions for 97 yards, while Jason Sehorn intercepted two passes including the aforementioned touchdown.  Due to an injury by Tiki Barber and Ron Dayne's disappointing play, reserve running back Damon Washington received considerable playing time in the second half and contributed a career-high 90 yards rushing.

\

Week 5: at St. Louis Rams  

at The Dome at America's Center, St. Louis, Missouri

 Date: October 14, 2001
 Game time: 12:00 p.m. CST (1:00 p.m. EST)
 TV: FOX
 Announcers: Pat Summerall, John Madden, and Ron Pitts
 Referee: Gerald Austin

The Giants then went on the road for a nationally televised day game against the 4–0 Rams.  The Greatest Show on Turf had outscored their opponents 127–53 in their first four games and were favored by 10.5 points to win.

To the surprise of many, the Giants' defense held the Rams in check, holding them to a season-low 15 points.  They forced 4 turnovers while also sacking Kurt Warner 6 times.  Michael Strahan was particularly masterful for the Giants defense, sacking Warner 4 times.

The Giants opened the game with an 80-yard drive that ended with a Ron Dayne 4-yard touchdown run.  The Rams answered with three Jeff Wilkins field goals, the last one of which came as time expired in the first half to give St. Louis a 9–7 lead heading into the locker room.  After a scoreless fourth quarter, the Giants capitalized off a Marshall Faulk fumble with Kerry Collins finding Ike Hilliard for a 25-yard touchdown to make the score 14–9 with 13:33 remaining.  However, after three quarters of great defense, the team could not hold when it mattered most.  The Rams went on a 77-yard drive and advanced to the Giants' 1-yard line after a Sam Garnes pass interference penalty, on a play where Kurt Warner was temporarily knocked out of the game with an injury.  Backup Jamie Martin entered the game for one play, which was a 1-yard touchdown run by Trung Canidate to give the Rams a 15–14 lead with 4:17 to go.  After a three-and-out, the Giants forced a three-and-out to give their offense one more chance to win the game with 1:51 to go.  However, Collins was intercepted by defensive end Grant Wistrom to finally clinch the game for the Rams.

Week 6: vs. Philadelphia Eagles  

at Giants Stadium, East Rutherford, New Jersey

 Date: October 22, 2001
 Game time: 9:00 p.m. EST
 TV: ABC
 Announcers: Al Michaels, Dan Fouts, Dennis Miller,  Melissa Stark, and Eric Dickerson
 Referee: Jeff Triplette

The Giants' next game was a loss to the division-rival Eagles in a Monday Night game.  The Giants dominated the first half, but failed to get in the end zone despite two goal-to-go situations and were forced to settle for three Morten Andersen field goals and a 9–0 halftime lead.  With 1:52 remaining, Donovan McNabb threw an 18-yard touchdown pass to James Thrash, and the ensuing extra point gave the Eagles their first lead of the night, 10–9.  On the next drive, Kerry Collins was sacked and forced to fumble by Jeremiah Trotter, and the Eagles recovered the ball to clinch the game.

Week 7: at Washington Redskins  

at FedExField, Landover, Maryland

 Date: October 28, 2001
 Game time: 4:05 p.m. EST
 TV: FOX
 Announcers: Curt Menefee, Brian Baldinger, and Dave Feldman
 Referee: Larry Nemmers

After two losses by a point each, the Giants were expected to get back on track at Washington.  However, they faced a completely different team than the one they beat in Week 4.

On the second play from scrimmage, Kerry Collins lost a fumble on a snap, and Washington capitalized with Tony Banks finding rookie receiver Rod Gardner for a 12-yard touchdown pass.  Later in the quarter, Washington punt returner Eric Metcalf returned a punt 89 yards for a touchdown to make it 14–0.  The Giants came back to tie the game in the second quarter, with Collins finding Amani Toomer for a 6-yard touchdown and then finding Ike Hilliard for a 27-yard touchdown to tie the score.  A 43-yard field goal by Washington kicker Brett Conway made the score 17–14 at the half.

In the third quarter, the Giants were hit hard by a trick play.  Receiver Kevin Lockett threw a 31-yard touchdown to Derrius Thompson on an option pass play to make the score 24–14 Washington, and another field goal made the score 27–14 heading into the final quarter.  Kerry Collins threw a 1-yard touchdown to fullback Greg Comella to narrow the deficit to 27–21, but Washington clinched the game with Tony Banks finding Michael Westbrook for a 76-yard touchdown.

Although Kerry Collins threw for 346 yards and 3 touchdowns with an interception, Washington outgained the Giants on the ground 157–42.

Week 8: at Dallas Cowboys 

    
    
    
    
    
    
    
    
    

The Giants initially appeared to be on their way to a defeat against a Cowboys team that not only was 2–4 heading into the game but was playing without their first- and second-string quarterbacks as well as star running back Emmitt Smith.  However, the Giants were able to come back from a 17-point deficit to finally end their three-game losing skid.

The Giants, who were 10.5 point favorites to win the game, played poorly in the first half.  Late in the first quarter, the Giants allowed Cowboys third-string quarterback Clint Stoerner to throw a 16-yard touchdown to Joey Galloway to make it a 10–0 game.  In the second quarter, Kerry Collins self-destructed.  He began the quarter by throwing an interception to linebacker Dexter Coakley, who returned Collins' errant pass 29 yards for a touchdown to make it 17–0.  With 3:22 to go in the half, the Giants finally got on the board with Collins throwing a 4-yard touchdown pass to Joe Jurevicius, and they had another chance to score late in the half after a Cowboys punt.  However, Collins threw a second interception, this time to Mario Edwards, who returned it 71 yards for a touchdown with 39 seconds left in the half to give the Cowboys a 24–7 lead heading into the locker room.

During halftime, a special presentation honoring the Meadowlands Sports Complex's 25th anniversary was shown, highlighting some of the greatest events held at the complex. Also, some of the staff members who first worked at the complex were also honored. Coincidentally, the Giants were playing the Cowboys, who was their first opponent at Giants Stadium. 

The second half was a different story.  The Cowboys began to play poorly, and the Giants were able to capitalize.  Clint Stoerner was particularly terrible, throwing four interceptions in a five-drive span.  The first interception was by rookie cornerback Will Peterson to set up a 34-yard touchdown from Kerry Collins to Joe Jurevicius to narrow the score to 24–14, the second interception was made by Jason Sehorn, the third interception was made by Dhani Jones to set up a Morten Andersen field goal to make it a one-score game at 24–17, and Brandon Short was the recipient of Stoerner's fourth interception.  Finally, in between the third and fourth interceptions, Thabiti Davis blocked and recovered a Cowboys punt to set up a Collins touchdown to Ike Hilliard to tie the game at 24–24 with 8:19 to go.  However, a Ron Dayne fumble and a missed 59-yard field goal by Andersen as time expired prevented the Giants from completing the comeback in regulation, and the game went into overtime.

Cowboys coach Dave Campo benched Clint Stoerner after his fourth interception, and with the first three quarterbacks on the team out, Ryan Leaf came in for his first appearance as a Dallas Cowboy, as well as his first game after his disastrous tenure with the Chargers.  His appearance in this game brought more of the same as a Micheal Barrow sack of Leaf forced a Cowboys punt on overtime's first possession.  A 33-yard pass from Kerry Collins to Ike Hilliard put the Giants in Cowboys territory, and problems almost happened when Tiki Barber fumbled after catching a 10-yard pass from Collins, but he recovered his own fumble and the Giants were in field goal range.  Morten Andersen this time came through on a more manageable 42-yard attempt, and the Giants completed their double-digit comeback win.

Despite the 17 point deficit, few analysts considered this game a great comeback win, and considered it more of an unimpressive win given the Cowboys' 4 second-half interceptions and the 5 Giants turnovers in the game.  However, the win put the Giants back at .500.

Week 9: at Arizona Cardinals  

at Sun Devil Stadium, Tempe, Arizona

 Date: November 11, 2001
 Game time: 2:15 p.m. MST (4:15 p.m. EST)
 TV: FOX
 Announcers: Kenny Albert, Tim Green, and D.J. Johnson
 Referee: Mike Carey

The Giants next traveled to the desert to take on the Arizona Cardinals.  Held just one week after the 2001 World Series concluded, the media had a field day comparing the Giants to the Yankees and the Cardinals to the series-winning Diamondbacks.  However, the Giants would assure that this contest would have a different ending.

The Giants opened the scoring with Ron Dayne running in for a 3-yard touchdown run in the first quarter.  In the second quarter, the Giants extended their lead with Kerry Collins throwing a 27-yard touchdown pass to Ike Hilliard.  However, the Cardinals struck back with Jake Plummer throwing a 38-yard touchdown pass to star receiver David Boston to make it a 14–7 game heading into the locker room.  The Giants clinched the game with a fourth-down stop with 4:11 remaining.

Tiki Barber ran for 118 yards on 17 carries.

Week 10: at Minnesota Vikings 

at Hubert H. Humphrey Metrodome, Minneapolis, Minnesota

 Date: November 19, 2001
 Game time: 8:00 p.m. CST (9:00 p.m. EST)
 TV: ABC
 Announcers: Al Michaels, Dan Fouts, Dennis Miller, Melissa Stark, and Eric Dickerson
 Referee: Bob McElwee

The Giants' third and final Monday Night game of the season was at Minnesota for a rematch of the 2000 NFC Championship game.  However, Randy Moss would ensure that this game would have a different outcome.

The Vikings scored on just the fourth play from scrimmage, with Daunte Culpepper hitting Randy Moss for a 28-yard touchdown to make it 7–0.  The Giants came back at the end of the quarter with Morten Andersen kicking a 43-yard field goal and Tiki Barber running in for a 1-yard touchdown to make the score 10–7 Giants heading into the second quarter.  However, in that quarter, Randy Moss caught his second touchdown of the game from Culpepper and the Vikings regained the lead, holding a 14–13 lead heading into the intermission.  Andersen kicked a 51-yard field goal to give the Giants a 16–14 lead heading into the final quarter, but a 1-yard touchdown pass from Culpepper to Cris Carter gave the Vikings a 21–16 lead with 9:03 to go.  Then with 6:32 to go, Culpepper hit Moss over the middle on a crossing route, who then headed upfield and outran the Giants secondary for a 57-yard touchdown to complete the scoring.

Randy Moss caught 10 passes for 171 yards and 3 touchdowns.  Cris Carter also caught 10 passes.  Daunte Culpepper threw for 277 yards and 4 touchdowns, albeit with 2 interceptions.

Week 11: vs. Oakland Raiders  

at Giants Stadium, East Rutherford, New Jersey

 Date: November 25, 2001
 Game time: 4:15 p.m. EST
 TV: CBS
 Announcers: Greg Gumbel, Phil Simms, and Armen Keteyian
 Referee: Bill Carollo

The Giants next went home to take on the red-hot Raiders, who came into this game with a 7–2 record.  In the first quarter, the Giants again allowed an opening drive touchdown, capped off by running back Zack Crockett running in for a 1-yard touchdown.  The Giants' misery continued in the second quarter with Rich Gannon throwing two touchdown passes.  The first was to running back Charlie Garner for a 21-yard score, then the second was to Tim Brown on a post pattern for a 46-yard touchdown to make it 21–3 Oakland heading into the locker room.

In the second half, a rainstorm ravaged Giants Stadium as both teams struggled to gain footing on the grass surface.  Initially the Giants did better under the new conditions, with Tiki Barber running in for a 12-yard touchdown to make it 21–10 heading into the final quarter.  However, in the fourth quarter, Rich Gannon found Tim Brown for his second receiving touchdown of the day on a 19-yard pass.

In the losing effort, Tiki Barber ran for 124 yards and a touchdown on 19 carries.  But the Giants were back below .500 with a 5–6 record.

Week 12: Bye Week

Week 13: at Dallas Cowboys  

at Texas Stadium, Irving, Texas

 Date: December 9, 2001
 Game time: 12:00 p.m. CST (1:00 p.m. EST)
 TV: FOX
 Announcers: Sam Rosen, Bill Maas, and Mike Doocy
 Referee: Ed Hochuli

The Giants turned out yet another poor performance after their bye week, losing to the Cowboys for the only time during the three-year span Dave Campo coached the team.

For much of the first half, the Giants were in control of the game.  They led 13–6 at the half, with the key score being Kerry Collins' 2-yard touchdown pass to tight end Marcellus Rivers.  However, in the second half, Emmitt Smith ran in for a 1-yard touchdown to tie the score, then rookie quarterback Quincy Carter found tight end Jackie Harris for a 3-yard touchdown in the fourth quarter.

Tiki Barber ran for 110 yards on 18 carries.  However, with a 5–7 record, the Giants would now have to win out just to have a chance to make the playoffs and have a shot at defending their NFC crown.

Week 14: vs. Arizona Cardinals  

at Giants Stadium, East Rutherford, New Jersey

 Date: December 15, 2001
 Game time: 1:30 p.m. EST
 TV: FOX
 Announcers: Sam Rosen, Bill Maas and Mike Crispino
 Referee: Dick Hantak

The Giants' first game to avoid potential elimination from the NFC playoff race was a Saturday afternoon game at home against the Cardinals.

In the first quarter, Kerry Collins hit Ron Dixon for a 26-yard touchdown pass, and the Giants held a 7–6 lead at halftime.  After a 39-yard field goal by Morten Andersen made it a 10–6 game in the fourth quarter, the Cardinals took the lead with 4:04 to go with Jake Plummer finding Tywan Mitchell for a 24-yard touchdown.  The Giants then marched slowly but surely down the field on an 11-play drive featuring two third down conversions.  With just 25 seconds remaining, Collins found Amani Toomer for the game-winning touchdown on a 4-yard touchdown pass.  Two Hail Mary attempts by Plummer failed at the end of the game.

Regardless of the last-minute win and the importance the game had in the Giants avoiding elimination, the game will forever be best known for Cardinals kicker Bill Gramatica's catastrophic celebration in the first quarter.  After kicking a 42-yard field goal to open the scoring, Gramatica jumped in the air to celebrate (as was customary for him and his brother Martin), but upon landing, he fell awkwardly on his right leg (his planting leg as he was left-footed) and tore his ACL.  What few remember is that Gramatica stayed in the game and kicked another field goal and extra point, but the injury rendered him completely ineffective for kickoffs and safety Pat Tillman (playing in his final NFL season before retiring to join the military) replaced him for the remainder of the game.  After the game, Gramatica was ruled out for the remainder of the season.

Week 15: vs. Seattle Seahawks  

at Giants Stadium, East Rutherford, New Jersey

 Date: December 19, 2001
 Game time: 1:00 p.m. EST
 TV: CBS
 Announcers: Kevin Harlan, Craig James, and Beasley Reece
 Referee: Ron Winter

The Giants' home matchup with the Seahawks started with the two teams trading touchdowns in the first quarter.  Shaun Alexander opened the scoring with a 29-yard touchdown run for the Seahawks, but Ron Dayne answered with a 31-yard touchdown to tie the score.  In the second quarter, linebacker Micheal Barrow sacked Matt Hasselbeck and forced him to fumble, with Michael Strahan recovering the loose ball and returning it 13 yards for a touchdown to give the Giants their first lead of the day, 14–10.  However, later in the quarter, the Seahawks also scored a defensive touchdown.  Antonio Cochran sacked Kerry Collins and forced him to fumble, with defensive tackle John Randle recovering the ball in the end zone for the Seahawks to regain the lead.  A Morten Andersen 32 yard field goal tied the score at 17–17 for halftime.

In the third quarter after Ron Dixon fumbled the second half kickoff, Shaun Alexander scored another touchdown, this one a 16-yard pass from Matt Hasselback, to make the score 24–17 Seattle with 12:41 remaining, the Seahawks didn’t score again.  With 2:52 remaining, the Giants were at their own 4-yard line, needing to drive 96 yards for a game-winning touchdown down 24–20.  Kerry Collins drove the Giants to the 7-yard line for a goal-to-go situation with 33 seconds left, when two incomplete passes brought up third down.  Collins then found Ike Hilliard for the game-winning score with just 20 seconds remaining.

Amani Toomer caught 8 passes for 124 yards while Ike Hilliard caught 7 passes for 105 yards and a touchdown.

Week 16: at Philadelphia Eagles  

at Veterans Stadium, Philadelphia, Pennsylvania

 Date: December 30, 2001
 Game time: 4:05 p.m. EST
 TV: FOX
 Announcers: Dick Stockton, Troy Aikman, Daryl Johnston, and Pam Oliver
 Referee: Gerald Austin

Now 7–7, the Giants were in a must-win game at Philadelphia.  A loss for the Giants would result in the team being officially eliminated from the NFC playoff race just one season after representing the conference in the Super Bowl.  What ensued was a wild game with an even more outrageous finish that stands head-to-toe with Giants-Eagles games that have gained far more notoriety.

That being said, few notable events happened in the first half.  The only score of the half was a 6-yard touchdown from Donovan McNabb to tight end Chad Lewis to give the Eagles a 7–0 lead.  In the third quarter, the game started to pick up.  The Giants ran a flea flicker, with Kerry Collins going deep and hitting Amani Toomer for a 60-yard touchdown to tie the game.  A 25-yard field goal by Morten Andersen made the score 10–7 Giants heading into the final quarter.

A defensive battle all but dissipated as the two offenses erupted for 28 points in the fourth quarter.  Less than a minute into the quarter, Donovan McNabb found his favorite target, James Thrash, for a 57-yard touchdown and the Eagles regained the lead, 14–10.  Another Morten Andersen field goal followed to make the score 14–13.  Then with 2:43 remaining, Ron Dayne broke through for a go-ahead 16-yard touchdown, and a successful two-point conversion made the score 21–14 Giants.

However, the lead would not last.  Donovan McNabb drove the Eagles on a 67-yard drive after the ensuing kickoff, complete with a 32-yard pass to James Thrash.  On the next play, McNabb found Chad Lewis for his second touchdown of the day, a 7-yard touchdown that tied the score 21–21 with 1:49 remaining.  The Giants' next drive went nowhere, with two incomplete passes stopping the clock, and the Eagles got the ball back with 58 seconds remaining.  McNabb hit Thrash for a 25-yard gain.  Then, after McNabb gained a first down on a running play, Michael Strahan committed a costly error by refusing to let McNabb up after he had touched him down, resulting in a clock-stopping delay of game penalty.  After one more 11-yard run by McNabb, David Akers kicked a 35-yard field goal with just 7 seconds remaining, making the score 24–21 Eagles.

With David Akers' ensuing kickoff going into the end zone for a touchback, virtually everyone watching assumed the game had finally been decided.  However, the Giants had one more play, and Jim Fassel called 86 Lambuth Special - a hook and lateral play named after Ron Dixon's number and the small college in Tennessee he attended, and a play the Giants hadn't even practiced since training camp.  Kerry Collins dropped back and threw to Tiki Barber on an angle pattern over the middle, who then acted as he was going right.  However, Barber then abruptly lateraled the ball to Dixon, who cut to the left sideline.  To the shock of nearly all watching, Dixon took off down the sideline and appeared to have a chance at a touchdown.  However, upon reaching field goal range he began running out of room, and safety Damon Moore avoided problems for the Eagles by knocking Dixon out of bounds just 6 yards short of the end zone.  The relieved Eagles then celebrated their NFC East title and the Giants were eliminated from playoff contention.

Kerry Collins threw for 303 yards and a touchdown, while Tiki Barber gained 156 all-purpose yards.  Michael Strahan dominated Eagles tackle Jon Runyan, sacking Donovan McNabb 3.5 times.  This total put him at 21.5 sacks for the year, half a sack short of former Jets defensive end Mark Gastineau's single-season record.

Although the Giants ultimately failed to win in stunning fashion on the final play, the 86 Lambuth Special play captured the imagination of the football world for the remainder of the season.  The Giants would run the play again a week later, and even the Eagles would adopt the play and run it in the final play of the NFC Championship against the Rams in a last-ditch effort to score a game-winning touchdown.

Week 17: vs. Green Bay Packers  

at Giants Stadium, East Rutherford, New Jersey

 Date: January 6, 2002
 Game time: 1:00 p.m. EST
 TV: FOX
 Announcers: Dick Stockton, Troy Aikman, Daryl Johnston, and Pam Oliver original announcers for September 16, 2001: Pat Summerall, John Madden, Ron Pitts 
 Referee: Johnny Grier

With the Giants out of playoff contention heading into the final week of the season, Giants Stadium was roughly half-filled for the season finale against the Packers even though official attendance was 78,601.  Just about the only factor of interest regarding the game for many was Michael Strahan's chance at achieving the single-season sack record.  With 21.5 sacks, he was half a sack short of former Jet Mark Gastineau's single season record of 22 sacks, and needed a sack to break the record.  Gastineau was among those in attendance for the game.

In general, however, the Giants didn't look like a playoff team for the first three quarters of this contest.  The defense was particularly terrible, as they allowed Brett Favre to throw for 315 yards on just 15 completions, Ahman Green to run for 101 yards, and two receivers (Corey Bradford and Bill Schroeder) to have 100-yard days receiving.  This defensive futility negated the 524 yards of total offense the Giants amassed during the contest.

In the first quarter, the Packers got on the board with Brett Favre finding Bill Schroeder for a 26-yard touchdown.  On the next Packers drive, a 25-yard touchdown run by Ahman Green made it 14–0 Packers.  The Giants were able to score before the end of the quarter with Kerry Collins finding Ike Hilliard for an 8-yard touchdown.  At halftime, the score was 17–10 Packers.

However, the Packers dominated the third quarter.  Another Ahman Green touchdown made the score 24–10.  Then later in the quarter, Brett Favre went deep and found Corey Bradford for a 54-yard touchdown to make it a 34–10 game heading into the final quarter.  The Giants did have moments in the fourth quarter, with Tiki Barber running in for a 10-yard touchdown, then with Ron Dayne running in for a 1-yard touchdown and two-point conversion to narrow the score to 34–25 with 2:50 remaining.  But the scoring hardly mattered as the Packers had been in control from the outset of the game.  The final play of the game was another execution of 86 Lambuth Special – the hook and lateral play from the previous week against the Eagles – but the play went for 29 yards rather than 74.

Throughout the game, Michael Strahan did come close to getting his record-breaking sack, but Brett Favre got the ball away each time he threatened.  Finally, on the first play of the Packers' drive after the Giants' final touchdown, Strahan got his sack on a controversial play.  Favre dropped back, and with Strahan closing in, simply fell to the ground and let Strahan sack him so he could break the record.  In the days after the game, numerous analysts criticized the play and went as far as to state that Strahan did not deserve the record due to the intentional nature of the sack.  They further noted that Strahan came in largely unblocked, leaving many to believe that the Packers had simply run a designed play so the record could be broken.  Despite the criticisms however, Strahan's new mark of 22.5 was ultimately recognized as the sack record and remains unbroken as of today.

With this loss, the Giants concluded their season at 7–9.

Standings

See also
List of New York Giants seasons

References

 

New York Giants seasons
New York Giants
New York Giants season
21st century in East Rutherford, New Jersey
Meadowlands Sports Complex